A geode is a geological secondary formation within sedimentary and volcanic rocks. Geodes are hollow, vaguely spherical rocks, in which masses of mineral matter (which may include crystals) are secluded. The crystals are formed by the filling of vesicles in volcanic and subvolcanic rocks by minerals deposited from hydrothermal fluids; or by the dissolution of syn-genetic concretions and partial filling by the same or other minerals precipitated from water, groundwater, or hydrothermal fluids.

Formation 
Geodes can form in any cavity, but the term is usually reserved for more or less rounded formations in igneous and sedimentary rocks. They can form in gas bubbles in igneous rocks, such as vesicles in basaltic lava; or, as in the American Midwest, in rounded cavities in sedimentary formations. After rock around the cavity hardens, dissolved silicates and/or carbonates are deposited on the inside surface. Over time, this slow feed of mineral constituents from groundwater or hydrothermal solutions allows crystals to form inside the hollow chamber. Bedrock containing geodes eventually weathers and decomposes, leaving them present at the surface if they are composed of resistant material such as quartz. 

When cut in half, visible bands corresponding to varied stages of precipitation may at times show patterns that reveal points of fluid entry into the cavity and/or varied colors corresponding to changes in chemistry.

Coloration 

Geode banding and coloration is the result of variable impurities. Iron oxides will impart rust hues to siliceous solutions, such as the commonly observed iron-stained quartz. Most geodes contain clear quartz crystals, while others have purple amethyst crystals. Still others can have agate, chalcedony, or jasper banding or crystals such as calcite, dolomite, celestite, etc. There is no easy way of telling what the inside of a geode holds until it is cut open or broken apart. However, geodes from a particular area are usually similar in appearance.

Geodes and geode slices are sometimes dyed with artificial colors. Samples of geodes with unusual colors or highly unlikely formations have usually been synthetically altered.

Occurrence 
Geodes are found where the geology is suitable with many of the commercially available ones coming from Brazil, Uruguay, Namibia, and Mexico. Large, amethyst-lined geodes are a feature of the basalts of the Paraná and Etendeka traps found in Brazil, Uruguay and Namibia. Geodes are common in some formations in the United States (mainly in Indiana, Iowa, Missouri, western Illinois, Kentucky, and Utah). In Oregon they are referred to as thundereggs (which are normally completely filled solid) and are the Oregon State Rock. Geodes are also abundant in the Mendip Hills in Somerset, England, where they are known locally as "potato stones".

Crystal caves

'Crystal cave' is both an informal term for any large crystal-lined geode and also used for specific geoheritage locations such as the Crystal Cave (Ohio), discovered in 1887 at the Heineman Winery on Put-In-Bay, Ohio, the Cave of the Crystals (Mexico), and the Pulpi Geode, discovered in 1999 in Spain. In 1999, a mineralogist group discovered a cave filled with giant selenite (gypsum) crystals in an abandoned silver mine, Mina Rica, near Pulpi, Province of Almeria, Spain. The cavity, which measured , was, at the time, the largest crystal cave ever found. Following its discovery, the entrance to the cave was blocked by five tons of rock, with an additional police presence to prevent looters. In the summer of 2019 the cave, a significant geotourism resource and now named the 'Geoda de Pulpi', Pulpi Geode, was opened as a tourist attraction, allowing small groups (max. 12 people) to visit the caves with a tour guide.

See also

Bristol Diamonds
Coso artifact
Lithophysa
Septarian nodule
Thunderegg

References

Further reading
Pough, Fredrick H. Rocks and Minerals, 
Middleton, Gerard V. (2003). Encyclopedia of Sediments and Sedimentary Rocks. Springer, p. 221
Keller, Walter David (1961). The Common Rocks and Minerals of Missouri. University of Missouri Press, S. 67
Witzke, Brian J. Geodes: A Look at Iowa's State Rock. Iowa Geological Survey
Geodes Kentucky Geological Survey (University of Kentucky)

External links

Indiana geode specimens, facts and stories
Video of a geode cracking using industrial soil pipe cutter
Australian Museum Fact sheet
Utah Geode Beds

Rocks
Mineralogy
Petrology